Gustavo Kuerten and Nicolás Lapentti were the defending champions, but did not participate this year.

Todd Woodbridge and Mark Woodforde won the title, defeating Lleyton Hewitt and Sandon Stolle 6–4, 6–2 in the final.

Seeds

Draw

Draw

References
Draw

Doubles
2000 ATP Tour